Goša FOM (full legal name: Goša Fabrika Opreme i Mašina) is a Serbian rail vehicle and equipment manufacturer, based in Smederevska Palanka, Serbia.

History
Goša FOM was founded in 1923 in Smederevska Palanka, Kingdom of Serbs, Croats and Slovenes.

Company GOŠA originally AD JASENICA founded in 1923 by French and Serbian capital shares for production and repair of railway cars and steel structures.

The year of 1930 is considered as foundation year of GOŠA FOM A.D. in terms of it is today when they initiated the shop for manufacture of steel structures, cranes, iron bridges and other structures.

The 1950 - 1960 period was characterized by production of steel structures for various applications, cranes, tanks and power generating equipment.

In the middle of seventies in the production program have been included coke and metallurgical equipment production and at the beginning of eighties they started with production of open and ground pit mining equipment and gearboxes. Those were the years when Gosa Fom production program has been founded and when they're winning European and world market.

Along with winning of new production programs and markets, Gosa Fom have established considerable business - technical relationships with many well-known world companies. With German companies Takraf and Eickhoff have been taken the production of complete mining equipment and gearboxes of world-wide quality and considerable cooperation with European and world companies have been established in scope of energetic, metallurgy and mining industry.

Aiming the investments and personnel toward continuous development and winning of new products, with unmeasurable assistance and support of business partners, have been featured present production program of the company that include power generating equipment, coke and metallurgical equipment and machines, mining equipment, gearboxes, cranes, processing equipment, steel structures and bridges.

Gosa Fom today – it is modern company, world-wide recognized and oriented to market that thanks to its own engineering, designing, technological and production knowledge and workmanship fulfill the most rigorous world criteria.

Policy of openness to the every form of cooperation with European and world companies including mutual investment remains as the one of strategic orientation of the company in the future period GOŠA FOM History

See also
 Transport in Serbia

References

External links
 

1923 establishments in Serbia
Companies based in Smederevska Palanka
Locomotive manufacturers of Serbia
Manufacturing companies established in 1923
Rail transport in Serbia
Rolling stock manufacturers of Serbia